Andrew Marshall Porter (6 January 1874 – 5 June 1900) was an Irish barrister who was killed in the Second Boer War while fighting for the Imperial Yeomanry. He was also a noted sportsman, representing Ireland at both cricket and field hockey.

Born at Donnycarney, Porter was the son of Andrew Marshall Porter, Sr. (later 1st Baronet), a lawyer who was an MP for Londonderry and served variously as Ireland's Solicitor-General, Attorney-General, and Master of the Rolls, and his wife Agnes Horsburgh. The elder Porter sent his son to Harrow School, where he kept wicket for the school's cricket team and was praised by James Lillywhite, a former England captain, as a "very hard hitter". In 1892, he played in the annual match between Eton and Harrow at Lord's, which Harrow won. Despite being offered a scholarship to Oxford, Porter opted to return home to study law at the University of Dublin. He continued his cricket career for the Dublin University Cricket Club, and during the 1895 season, played in four matches with first-class status – against the Marylebone Cricket Club (MCC) in Dublin, against Leicestershire and Cambridge University on a brief tour of England, and then a return fixture against Cambridge University in Dublin. He played solely as a batsman (Arthur Gwynn being given the wicket-keeping duties), with his highest score being 44 against Leicestershire.

In 1896, Porter was selected to represent the Irish national team against the MCC, in a match that did not have first-class status. He scored 18 runs as Ireland won by an innings, but did not play for his country again. During the Irish winter, during which no cricket was played, Porter played hockey for the Three Rock Rovers, gaining selection for the national hockey team in 1897. After graduating from Dublin University, he was called to the Irish Bar, becoming a barrister. However, in 1900, Porter enlisted as a private in the 45th (Dublin) Company of the Imperial Yeomanry, and was sent to South Africa. In June of that year, while fighting at Ladywood (near Lindley in the Orange Free State), he was badly wounded and four days later died of wounds. Porter's death was commemorated by his father with the establishment of the Marshall Porter Memorial Prize, for classics students, as well as a stained-glass window in the Graduates Memorial Building.

See also
 List of cricketers who were killed during military service
 List of Irish first-class cricketers

References

1874 births
1900 deaths
British Army personnel of the Second Boer War
British military personnel killed in the Second Boer War
People educated at Harrow School
Dublin University cricketers
Irish cricketers
Irish male field hockey players
Irish soldiers in the British Army
Cricketers from County Dublin
Irish barristers
Younger sons of baronets
Three Rock Rovers Hockey Club players
Ireland international men's field hockey players